Camacha is a parish in the municipality of Santa Cruz, on the southeastern part of Madeira Island. It is situated in the mountainous interior of the island, 3 km north of Caniço, 7 km northeast of Funchal and 6 km west of Santa Cruz. The population in 2011 was 7,449, in an area of 19.77 km2.

The first organized game of football in Portugal took place in 1875 in Camacha, organized by the Madeira-born Harry Hinton.

References

Freguesias of Santa Cruz, Madeira